Emma Constance Healey is a British novelist. Her debut novel, Elizabeth is Missing (2014) won the annual Costa Book Award, Best First Novel.

Life and career

Born in London, Healey completed a foundation year at Central Saint Martins before graduating with a BA in Book Arts and Crafts from the London College of Communication. She graduated from the University of East Anglia with an MA in creative writing (prose fiction) in 2011.

Awards
2014: Costa Book Award for First Novel, winner, Elizabeth is Missing
2015: Baileys Women's Prize for Fiction, longlist, Elizabeth is Missing 
2015: Betty Trask Award, Elizabeth is Missing

Works
2014: Elizabeth is Missing
2018: Whistle in the Dark

References

External links
 

1985 births
Living people
Alumni of Central Saint Martins
Alumni of the London College of Communication
Alumni of the University of East Anglia
Costa Book Award winners
Writers from London
21st-century English writers